Sphecosoma cognata is a moth in the subfamily Arctiinae. It was described by Francis Walker in 1856. It is found in Mexico, Colombia and the Amazon region.

References

Moths described in 1856
Sphecosoma